The Bobbie Lewis Quality is a Victoria Racing Club, Group 2, Thoroughbred quality handicap horse race for horses of four years old and older, over a distance of 1,200 metres at the Flemington Racecourse, Melbourne, Australia in September. Total prizemoney for the race is A$300,000.

History

Name
 1974–1995 - Bobbie Lewis Quality Handicap
 1996 - Pat Lalor Quality
 1997 - Sebel Of Melbourne Quality 1200
 1998–2000 - Gateway Suites Quality
 2001–2008 - Bobbie Lewis Quality
 2009 - Hong Kong Jockey Club Stakes
 2010 onwards - Bobbie Lewis Quality

Grade
 1974–1978 - Listed Race
 1979–1985 - Principal Race
 1986–2014 - Group 3
 2015 onwards - Group 2

Winners

 2022 - Baller
 2021 - Splintex
 2020 - Zoutori
 2019 - Zoutori
 2018 - Dothraki
 2017 - Redkirk Warrior
 2016 - Faatinah
 2015 - Churchill Dancer
 2014 - Chautauqua
 2013 - Speediness
 2012 - We're Gonna Rock
 2011 - Lone Rock
 2010 - Doubtful Jack
 2009 - Swift Alliance
 2008 - Bon Hoffa
 2007 - Bon Hoffa
 2006 - Bel Danoro
 2005 - Wildly
 2004 - Face Value
 2003 - Titanic Jack
 2002 - Chong Tong
 2001 - Scenic Peak
 2000 - Ruthless Tycoon
 1999 - Le Zagaletta
 1998 - El Mirada
 1997 - Great Condor
 1996 - Temperate Pug
 1995 - Cut Up Rough
 1994 - Hareeba
 1993 - Golden Sword
 1992 - Holiday Lover
 1991 - Street Ruffian
 1990 - Rare Chance
 1989 - Undoubted
 1988 - Placid Ark
 1987 - Special
 1986 - Taj Quillo
 1985 - Base Fee
 1984 - Sports Ruler
 1983 - Stellina
 1982 - Magari
 1981 - Soldier Of Fortune
 1980 - Mr. Magic
 1979 - Bit Of A Skite
 1978 - Quiet Snort
 1977 - Nearest
 1976 - Fiesta Palace
 1975 - Dark Ruler
 1974 - Citadel

See also
 List of Australian Group races
 Group races

References

Horse races in Australia